Paul Rizonico (born 16 February 1966) is a former Australian rules footballer who played with Collingwood in the Victorian Football League (VFL) and with Port Adelaide in the South Australian National Football League (SANFL).

Before joining Collingwood at the VFL level, Rizonico played for Bundoora's junior team.

In the 1987 season, Rizonico played 12 senior games and scored 5 goals, as well as contributing at the reserves level. For his contribution he won the Joseph Wren Memorial Trophy jointly with Mark Beers, when it was first awarded in 1987.

After leaving Collingwood, Rizonico joined Port Adelaide in the SANFL and played with them for six years, winning two premierships.

References

External links
 

1966 births
Australian rules footballers from Victoria (Australia)
Collingwood Football Club players
Port Adelaide Football Club (SANFL) players
Port Adelaide Football Club players (all competitions)
Living people